Saint-Pierre-du-Mont may refer to several communes in France:

Saint-Pierre-du-Mont, Calvados, in the Calvados département 
Saint-Pierre-du-Mont, Landes, in the Landes département 
Saint-Pierre-du-Mont, Nièvre, in the Nièvre département